Mario Chiesa can refer to:

 Mario Chiesa (cyclist) (born 1966), an Italian cyclist
 Mario Chiesa (politician) (born 1944), an Italian politician